Keith Thomson may refer to:
Keith Thomson (sportsman) (1941–2023), New Zealand cricketer and field hockey player
Keith Stewart Thomson (born 1938), professor of natural history
Keith Thomson (politician) (1919–1960), U.S. representative from Wyoming, 1955–1960

See also
Keith Thompson (disambiguation)